Newton Corner was a streetcar and passenger rail station in the Newton Corner neighborhood of Newton, Massachusetts, located near where Washington Street crosses the Massachusetts Turnpike. The Newton Corner station, known simply as Newton for much of its lifetime, served commuters on the Worcester Line (run by the New York Central Railroad and its predecessors) from 1834 to 1959. The trolley stop, located on the surface streets, served a number of routes beginning in 1898, including the Green Line A branch until 1969.

Newton Corner is now a stop and transfer point for a number of bus routes including high-frequency express routes to downtown Boston as well as local routes.

History

Railroad station

The Boston and Worcester Railroad opened the segment from downtown Boston to West Newton on April 7, 1834, with a station called Newton Corner opening then or soon after in the Angier's Corner neighborhood. The station was located on the south side of the tracks west of Centre Street. A second track was added in 1839, and in 1843 the railroad began offering season fares for around $60, making it one of the first commuter rail systems. Newton Corner was among the most popular stations, with ridership of 26,000 in 1866.

A village petition around 1870 resulted in the station being renamed as simply Newton. Third and fourth tracks through the station were built in 1884. Around this time, a new station building was built in the Richardsonian Romanesque style. The Boston & Worcester became part of the Boston and Albany Railroad in 1867, which itself was leased by the New York Central Railroad in 1900.

Trolley station

The first trolleys in Allston-Brighton had been a branch off the Cambridge Horse Railroad to Oak Square, and ran to Cambridge rather than downtown Boston. On June 13, 1896, trackage on Commonwealth Avenue (part of the future B branch) and Brighton Avenue opened as a direct electrified route to downtown; at the same time, the line was extended to just short of Newton Corner.

The line begun running to Park Street in the new Tremont Street Subway on November 8, 1897. On May 21, 1898, the line was extended to Nonantum Square at Newton Corner, where it met lines running from Cambridge via Watertown. On December 9, 1912, the transfer point was changed from Nonantum Square to Watertown Yard. This completed the Watertown Line from Park Street to Watertown Yard - its route for the next half-century. In the 1920s, a concrete boarding island was built in the square.

Closure

Both stations changed greatly when the Massachusetts Turnpike was extended from Route 128 in Weston to I-93 in downtown Boston. The highway occupied a significant portion of the right-of-way, dropping the Worcester Line from 4 to 2 tracks from Back Bay to Riverside. All local stops east of the Boston-Newton border were discontinued in April 1959; of the stations in Newton itself, Newton Corner was closed, Newtonville, West Newton, and Auburndale lost their depot buildings to construction but retained limited service, and Riverside, the furthest west, was unaffected. This marked the end of service on the Worcester Line to Newton Corner; it has not been a commuter rail stop during the MBTA era.

In 1964, the exit 17 rotary was constructed at Newton Corner. Expecting little traffic at the intersection, the trolley tracks were placed in a counterflow lane, while the platforms were moved to the north side of the rotary in a dedicated median. However, the rotary proved to be busy and congested, resulting in frequent delays and automobile-trolley collisions.

In 1967, the #69 trolley was renamed as the Green Line A branch. After a series of temporary bustitutions during the 1960s, the A branch was again "temporarily" substituted on June 21, 1969. However, the replacement route 57 bus became permanent and the trolleys never returned. The trackage was intact for non-revenue moves to Watertown Carhouse until 1994, but, except for rare fan trips, Newton Corner has not seen rail passengers since 1969.

Bus connections

Although no longer served by rail transport, Newton Corner is a major interchange for MBTA bus routes including the rail-replacement 57, six other local buses, and two express buses. During morning rush hour, the bus routes combine such that over 60 buses traverse the rotary hourly, making Newton Corner one of the busiest MBTA bus stops.

There are two bus stops on the rotary itself, with a large brick bench and shelter (more prominent than standard MBTA bus stops) on the southern (eastbound) side of the rotary and two standard shelters on the northern (westbound) part. Eleven routes stop at these locations:
 : Dedham Mall–
 : Watertown Yard–
 : Watertown Yard–
 : Brighton Center–Federal Street & Franklin Street (express)
 : Watertown Yard–Federal Street & Franklin Street (express)
 : Roberts–Newton Corner
 : Waverley Square–Newton Corner
 : Waltham Highlands–Newton Corner
 : Riverside station–Newton Corner

Routes 553, 554, 556, and 558 each loop one-and-one-half times around the rotary in order to stop at both the south and north bus stops on each run in order to serve passengers who do not wish to cross the fast-moving rotary traffic on foot. Similarly, outbound 504 buses loop completely around the rotary (except during the afternoon peak) before proceeding to Watertown. Routes 52, 57, and 193 only use the rotary stops in the southbound direction; northbound buses stop near the rotary on surface streets. Because these routes make local stops on both sides of the rotary, they do not make the extra loops. Route 501 only stops at the rotary stops during afternoon peak outbound trips; inbound trips only use the route 57 stop on Park Street to the south.

When proposals to reactivate the A branch were considered in the 1970s and 1980s, a likely possibility was that the trolleys would only return as far as Oak Square, with trolleybuses filling the gap between Watertown and Oak Square. The City of Newton did not approve of overhead lines, however, and the proposals never came to fruition. However, a limited version of the proposal was considered wherein the route 71 trolleybus would be extended from Watertown to Newton Corner. In the 2004 Program for Mass Transportation, the $1.5 million project was estimated to add 600 new daily transit riders but was given low priority compared to other bus expansion projects.

References

External links

Image of 1984 fantrip at Newton Corner

Buildings and structures in Newton, Massachusetts
Green Line (MBTA) stations
Railway stations in Middlesex County, Massachusetts
Former MBTA stations in Massachusetts
Railway stations closed in 1969
Railway stations in the United States opened in 1834
MBTA bus